Ambroisine Kpongo (born 11 November 1951) is a Central African Republic diplomat who has served as the country's Permanent Representative to the United Nations since 2014.

Early life and education
Kpongo was born on 11 November 1951. She has a diploma in political science and international relations from the Free University of Brussels in Belgium.

Career
Kpongo was Director of International Organizations at the Ministry of Foreign Affairs from 1991 until 1996, before becoming First Counsellor to the Permanent Mission of the Central African Republic to the UN in New York City in 1996.

Kpongo was appointed General Director for Political Affairs by General François Bozizé in 2003, and was Delegate Minister of Foreign Affairs from January 2009 until April 2011.

Kpongo was appointed Central African Republic's Permanent Representative to the UN by President Catherine Samba-Panza in September 2014.

References

External links
 Official website

Living people
1951 births
Université libre de Bruxelles alumni
Central African Republic women diplomats
Permanent Representatives of the Central African Republic to the United Nations
Women ambassadors